David was the second king of the United Kingdom of Israel and a figure in the scriptures of Abrahamic religions.

David may also refer to:

Arts, entertainment, and media

Film and television
 David (1951 film)
 David (1979 film), a West German film set in Nazi Germany
 David (1988 film), an American drama based on the story of David Rothenberg
 David (1997 film)
 David (2013 Hindi film)
 David (2020 film), an American short film
 David (TV series), a Flemish telenovela

Music
 David (David Hasselhoff album) (1991)
 David (David Meece album) (1976)
 David (David Ruffin album) (2004)
 David, a 1955 opera by Darius Milhaud
 The David (band), a 1960s/70s American garage rock band
 "David", a song by Animals as Leaders from the album Weightless, 2011

Visual art
 David (Bernini), a sculpture by Gian Lorenzo Bernini
 David (Donatello), either of two sculptures by Donatello
 David (inspired by Michelangelo), a sculpture by Turkish conceptual artist Serkan Özkaya
 David (Michelangelo), a sculpture by Michelangelo
 Replicas of Michelangelo's David
 David (Verrocchio), a sculpture by Andrea del Verrocchio

People
 David (name), a common given name
 David (surname)
 Dávid family, a Hungarian noble family, based in present-day Slovakia
 Jacques-Louis David (1748–1825), French painter often known only as David
 List of people named David
 David (footballer, born 1977)
 David (footballer, born 1982)
 David (footballer, born 1986)
 David (footballer, born 1990)
 David (footballer, born June 1995)
 David (footballer, born October 1995)
 David (footballer, born 1999)
 David (footballer, born 2001)

Places
 David, Chiriquí, Panama
 David, a village in Văleni Commune, Neamţ County, Romania
 David, Iowa, United States
 David, Kentucky, United States
 Camp David, the United States presidential retreat in Maryland
 David City, Nebraska, United States

Technology
 DAVID, a bioinformatics tool for high-throughput analysis of gene product functions
 DAVID (Digital Audio Video Interactive Decoder), a platform for digital TV made by Microware
 David Laserscanner, a software package and wiki for 3D laser scanning

Other uses
 David (car), a Spanish car-manufacturing company 
 CSS David, a Confederate torpedo boat during the American Civil War
 David Sunflower Seeds, a ConAgra Foods brand
 List of storms named David, tropical and extratropical cyclones named David

David's Bridal, an American formalwear chain
David's Supermarkets, a former supermarket chain in Texas

See also
 Dave (disambiguation)
 Davide (disambiguation)
 Davíð
 King David (disambiguation)
 Saint David (disambiguation)
 Dawid, a list of people with the given name or surname
 Devid (disambiguation), a list of people with the given name